De Sola is a surname. Notable people with the surname include:

Carla DeSola (born 1937), American teacher and choreographer of liturgical dance
David de Aaron de Sola (1796–1860), Amsterdam-born rabbi and writer 
Abraham de Sola (1825–1882), his son, Anglo-Canadian rabbi and author
 Meldola de Sola (1853–1918), Abraham's son, Canadian rabbi
 Frederick de Sola Mendes, his great grandson
 David de Sola Pool, his grandson
 Ithiel de Sola Pool, son of David
Pablo Vicente de Solá (1761–1826), colonial governor of Spanish Alta California
Sasha De Sola, American ballet dancer

See also

 Derek J. de Solla Price